Yvonne Rüegg (born 2 August 1938) is a Swiss former alpine skier. At the 1960 Winter Olympics, she won the gold medal in giant slalom.

She was born in Chur.

References

1938 births
Living people
Alpine skiers at the 1960 Winter Olympics
Swiss female alpine skiers
Olympic gold medalists for Switzerland
Olympic alpine skiers of Switzerland
Olympic medalists in alpine skiing
Medalists at the 1960 Winter Olympics
People from Chur
Sportspeople from Graubünden
20th-century Swiss women